The South American Race Walking Championships (Spanish: Campeonatos Sudamericanos de Marcha Atlética) is a biennial race walking competition organized by CONSUDATLE for athletes representing the countries of its member associations.  Races for senior men and women, for junior and for youth athletes are featured. In addition, there are separate team competitions. The event was established  (most probably) in 1989 as South American Race Walking Cup (Spanish: Copa Sudamericana de Marcha Atlética), and was occurring annually at first.  The 2001 event was held in conjunction with the Pan American Race Walking Cup.  The name as well as the frequency of the competition were changed in 2004.

Editions

Results
A couple of gold medal winners were published by Athletics Weekly, or CONSUDATLE. Results for the junior and youth competitions can be found on the World Junior Athletics History ("WJAH") webpage.  Further results were assembled from other sources.

Men's results

20 kilometres

1.): In 1997, Milo Dalton

2.): In 1998, some non-CONSUDATLE race walkers were invited to start out of competition.  Noah Geddes from  finished second in 1:25:13, Rogelio Sánchez from  finished 3rd in 1:27:04, and Ethan Timm from  finished 4th in 1:30:12.

35 kilometres

50 kilometres

Women's results

10 kilometres

20 kilometres

*: In 2012 and 2016, Érica Rocha de Sena from  got better times out of competition (1:33:24.0 and 1:34:09).

50 kilometres

Junior (U-20) Boy's Results

10 kilometres

Junior (U-20) Girl's Results

5 kilometres

10 kilometres

Youth (U-18) Boy's Results

5 kilometres

10 kilometres

Youth (U-18) Girl's Results

3 kilometres

5 kilometres

See also
IAAF World Race Walking Cup
European Race Walking Cup
Pan American Race Walking Cup
Asian Race Walking Championships
Oceania Race Walking Championships
Central American Race Walking Championships

References

External links
gbrathletics.com
World Junior Athletics History

 
Continental athletics championships
Racewalking competitions
Recurring sporting events established in 1989
Racewalking